is a female Japanese singer-songwriter originally from Hyogo, Japan and now residing in Osaka. She is known for performing theme songs for OVAs of Utawarerumono and To Heart 2. She has also done the opening for White Album 2, Todokanai Koi '13. On December 28, 2015, she had announced that she will go hiatus to treat her voice because she was diagnosed with psychogenic disphonia.

Discography

Singles 
 , released March 26, 2008
 , released March 26, 2008
 , released June 24, 2009
 , released September 22, 2010
 , released November 6, 2013

Albums 
 to You, released August 6, 2008
 Jewelry Song, released November 6, 2009
 l'espoir, released February 22, 2011
 , released August 7, 2013
 Emergence, released January 29, 2014

Notes

External links 
 Official website 

Anime musicians
Japanese women pop singers
Living people
1986 births
Musicians from Hyōgo Prefecture
Japanese women singer-songwriters
Japanese singer-songwriters
21st-century Japanese singers
21st-century Japanese women singers